Syed Zeeshan Zameer (born 20 December 2002) is a Pakistani cricketer. 

He made his Twenty20 debut on 11 February 2022, for Islamabad United in the 2022 Pakistan Super League. He played for the Pakistan under-19 team in the 2021 ACC Under-19 Asia Cup.

Personal life
He was born in Karachi into a Pashtun family to a father who worked as a delivery driver for a local beverage company, living with a large family of 28 with all of them residing in a single house in Nazimabad.

References

External Links
 

2002 births
Living people
Pashtun people
Pakistani cricketers
Cricketers from Karachi
Islamabad United cricketers